Kovačevci (Cyrillic: Ковачевци) may refer to:

Kovačevci, Grad, a settlement in the Municipality of Grad, northeastern Slovenia
Kovačevci (Derventa), a village in Bosnia and Herzegovina
Kovačevci, Glamoč, a village in Bosnia and Herzegovina

See also
Kovachevtsi (disambiguation) (Ковачевци)
Kovač (disambiguation)
Kovači (disambiguation)
Kovačić (disambiguation)
Kovačići (disambiguation)
Kovačica (disambiguation)
Kovačice, a village
Kovačina, a village
Kovačevo (disambiguation)
Kovačevac (disambiguation)
Kovačevići (disambiguation)
Kováčová (disambiguation)
Kováčovce, a village